The 1907 U.S. Open was the thirteenth U.S. Open, held June 20–21 at Philadelphia Cricket Club in Chestnut Hill, Pennsylvania, a neighborhood of northwest Philadelphia. Alec Ross posted four sub-80 rounds to win his only major title, two strokes ahead of runner-up Gilbert Nicholls.

After the first 36 holes on Thursday, Ross owned a one-shot lead over Jack Hobens, who recorded the first hole-in-one in U.S. Open history in the second round.

Hobens led Nicholls by one after the third round on Friday morning, but an 85 in the afternoon dropped him to fourth place. Ross began the round two behind Hobens and shot a 76 to prevail by two over Nicholls, who shot 79. Ross' older brother Donald, the famed golf course architect, finished tenth.

Defending champion Alex Smith opted to play in the Open Championship in England, held on the same two days at Hoylake.

Past champions in the field 

Source:

Round summaries

First round
Thursday, June 20, 1907 (morning)

Source:

Second round
Thursday, June 20, 1907 (afternoon)

Source:

Third round
Friday, June 21, 1907 (morning)

Source:

Final round
Friday, June 21, 1907 (afternoon)

Source:
 
Amateurs: Travers (324), Smith (328), Carr (334), West (335), Forrest (338), Cocharan (346).

References

External links
USGA Championship Database

U.S. Open (golf)
Golf in Pennsylvania
U.S. Open (golf)
U.S. Open (golf)
U.S. Open
U.S. Open (golf)